Aao Laut Chalein is a Pakistani drama serial directed by Shahood Alvi, produced by Babar Javed and written by Abu Rashid. It stars Shahood Alvi along with Naheed Shabbir, Asim Mehmood and Azekah Daniel. It aired every Saturday and Sunday at 9:00 PM. The story is about a young boy Kashan who left his house in search of his mother, who lives in Sukkur with her second husband.

Plot
Aao Laut Chalein is a story of a boy Kashan who travels to Sukkur to search for his mother, Anila. Anila is married to Ustad Roshan after getting a divorce from her first husband, Aslam. After going through intense struggles, Kashan finally finds his mother but she is unable to reciprocate the same feeling because Roshan does not want any association from her previous marriage. Anila tells Kashan to go back to Karachi but instead, he begins to live a nomadic life. Kashan finally gets work in a car garage as a “Chota” without knowing that the garage belongs to Ustad Roshan. Ustad is unaware of this fact and gets very attached to “Chota”.

When Kashan grows up he has a garage of his own and specializes in vintage cars. He falls in love with Manar, the other protagonist of the story who belongs to higher social strata. She uses him as her subject for an assignment, which is on cars. During this time he falls and confesses his love to her only to find out that she considered him as a friend. Kashan thinks it's because they have different social class and feels very doomed.

Cast

Asim Mehmood as Kashan 
Anas Yasin as Young Kashan
Azekah Daniel as Manar
Shahood Alvi as Roshan
Naheed Shabbir as Anila
Rashid Farooqui as Aslam
Faisal Naqvi
Sami Sani
Neelam Gul as Anzela
Sheryaar Khan

References 

Geo TV original programming
Urdu-language television shows
Serial drama television series